KUOC-LD, virtual channel 48 (UHF digital channel 33), is a low-powered Buzzr-affiliated television station serving Tulsa, Oklahoma, United States that is licensed to Enid. The station is owned by the DTV America Corporation. Its transmitter is located in Chandler Park in Tulsa.

History
The station was granted a construction permit as K48OC-D in October 2012. The current callsign, KUOC-LD, was adopted on April 8, 2013. The station was still silent until its sign on in Summer 2014. The actual date of the sign on is unknown.

It first began broadcasting as a DrTV affiliate. In 2016, the station's transmitter was relocated to the Tulsa area, and launched a second subchannel to carry the Sonlife Broadcasting Network. In November 2016, KUOC became a Buzzr affiliate.

Digital channels
The station's digital signal is multiplexed:

References

External links

Television channels and stations established in 2013
UOC-LD
Low-power television stations in the United States
Innovate Corp.
Buzzr affiliates
2013 establishments in Oklahoma
Movies! affiliates